NGC 6558 is a globular cluster, located about 24,000 light years away in the constellation Sagittarius. Its apparent magnitude is about 11 and its apparent diameter is about 10 arcminutes. The globular cluster was discovered in 1784 by the astronomer William Herschel with his 18.7-inch telescope and the discovery was later catalogued in the New General Catalogue.

It is located 1.5 degrees south-southeast of Gamma2 Sagittarii.

References

External links
 
 NGC 6558

Globular clusters
Sagittarius (constellation)
6558